There are numerous community gardens in the U.S. state of Nebraska. A community garden is a piece of land collectively farmed by several people and may be created by local residents purchasing or taking over a vacant plot, or by an institution such as a church donating land to the community. In Nebraska many of the community gardens are to be found in or near the principal cities of Omaha and Lincoln, although examples may also be found in smaller communities such as Grand Island.

Omaha

Dundee Community Garden 
Dundee Community Garden is in the Dundee neighborhood of Omaha. The garden site is located at 4902 Underwood. Dundee Community Garden is one of the most notable.  Dundee Community Garden is a member of the American Community Gardening Association. The garden was founded on a vacant lot in 2009 by a group of local residents.  In early 2013, Dundee Community Garden Inc., received non-profit status as a 501(c)(3) organization. After a fundraising campaign, which included support from the Sherwood Foundation and the Peter Kiewit Foundation, on 15 May 2013, DCG purchased the land from the previous owner.

The Big Garden
The Big Garden began in 2005. Initially funded by the USDA's Community Food Project, the Big Garden had a goal of creating 12 community gardens in three years. Five years later the Big Garden included 26 gardens in the metro-Omaha area and added a sister project, the Big Rural Garden, in Southeast Nebraska. Today, the Big Garden is a network of over 100 community gardens in metro-Omaha and rural and semi-rural communities in Nebraska, Kansas, and Iowa---and growing!

The second annual "Tour de Gardens" was held in Omaha in 2014 with approximately 100 bicycle riders visiting 8 gardens and a root facility.

Other

Lincoln 
Lincoln, Nebraska has 13 community gardens as of May 2014. All of these are full and the organising institution, Community CROPS (Combining Resources, Opportunities, and People for Sustainability), which was founded in 2003 with one garden, is now looking for new sites around Lincoln. In addition to the community gardens, CROPS also runs a training farm, a community supported agriculture program, and a regular stand at a local farmers' market.

Grand Island
A new community garden in Grand Island called the Cherry Street Community Garden was started in 2014, with  plots available for rent, supported by a city councilwoman and the adjacent Cherry Street Apartments complex.

See also

Community gardens in Omaha, Nebraska

References

Community gardening in the United States
Nebraska-related lists